The Eurovision Song Contest 2022 was the 66th edition of the Eurovision Song Contest. The three live shows were presented by Italian television presenter Alessandro Cattelan, Italian singer Laura Pausini and Lebanese-born British singer Mika.

Ukraine's 439 points received from the televote in the final are the most televoting points received in the contest's history to date, making "Stefania" the first song sung entirely in Ukrainian and the first song with hip-hop elements to win the contest. This was also a record-extending sixteenth time that the United Kingdom finished in second place.

The EBU reported that the contest had a television audience of 161 million viewers in 34 European markets, a decrease of 22 million viewers from the previous edition, however, it is noted that this is due to the exclusion of Russia and the lack of audience figures from Ukraine, with the overall figures up by 7 million viewers in a comparable market from 2021. An increase of three percent in the 15–24 year old age range was also reported. A total of 18 million viewers watched the contest online on YouTube and TikTok.

Location 

The 2022 contest took place in Turin, Italy, following the country's victory at the 2021 edition with the song "", performed by Måneskin. The selected venue was the 13,300-seat , a multi-purpose indoor arena located in the Santa Rita district, which serves as a venue for events including concerts, exhibitions, trade fairs, conferences, and sports (mainly those requiring an ice rink, such as ice hockey and curling).  had previously hosted the ice hockey events at the 2006 Winter Olympics, and the opening ceremonies of the 2007 Winter Universiade and will host the same event in 2025.

The venue returned to its full capacity for the contest, after the previous edition in Rotterdam saw a limited audience of 3,500 people as a precaution against the COVID-19 pandemic. However, the audience was required to wear masks at all times inside the venue, unlike in Rotterdam where mask-wearing was not enforced whenever the audience was seated. Nearly all COVID-19 prevention measures for the contest were dropped by 11 May 2022, with testing only required whenever symptoms were exhibited.

In addition to the main venue, the host city also organised side events in tandem with the contest. The Eurovision Village was the official Eurovision Song Contest fan and sponsors area during the event weeks, where it was possible to watch performances by contest participants and local artists, as well as the live shows broadcast from the main venue. The EuroClub, which took place across ten different locations in Turin, hosted the official after-parties and private performances by contest participants. Unlike in previous years, access to the EuroClub was not restricted to accredited fans, delegates and press. The "Turquoise Carpet" and Opening Ceremony events, where the contestants and their delegations were presented before the accredited press and fans, took place at the Palace of Venaria on 8 May 2022.

Bidding phase 

Between 23 and 28 May 2021, many cities across Italy expressed interest in hosting the contest. Representatives from the cities of Bologna, Milan, Pesaro, Naples and Turin voiced their interest, as well as the Mayor of Reggio Emilia, Luca Vecchi, who hoped to host the contest in the new RCF Arena, the largest open-air arena in Europe with a capacity of 100,000 spectators. The mayors of Rome, Rimini and Florence soon after also expressed interest in hosting the contest and were joined by Sanremo, Verona and Bari. , member of the Italian Chamber of Deputies, also suggested that if Rimini were to host the contest, it should be a co-production with San Marino RTV.

Host broadcaster RAI launched the bidding process on 7 July 2021. In the first phase of this process, any interested cities were to present their bid through certified email by 12 July, after which RAI and the EBU would proceed to send all of them a bid book with more detailed requirements for the cities to submit their plans for review.

On 9 July 2021, the city of Turin officially announced its bid. On the same day, the city of Pesaro did the same, proposing the Vitrifrigo Arena as a possible venue to host the event. They were followed by Bologna and Jesolo on 12 July, and Rimini and Bertinoro (jointly with Forlì and Cesena) on 13 July. On 13 July, RAI announced that 17 cities had submitted their bid for hosting the contest and would be provided the following day with the bid books. They had until 4 August to draft and submit their detailed plans, which 11 cities did. On 24 August, it was reported that Bologna, Milan, Pesaro, Rimini and Turin would be the cities left in the running to host the contest.

The choice among them was meant to be announced by the end of August; however, this did not happen, and in mid-September , director of Rai 1, stated that the selection was behind time to ensure "transparency and precision".

Key:
 Host venue
 Shortlisted
 Presented the bid book

Production 
The Eurovision Song Contest 2022 was produced by the Italian public broadcaster Radiotelevisione italiana (RAI).  and Simona Martorelli served as executive producers,  and  served as directors of the three live shows, Claudio Santucci served as head of show, and Emanuele Cristofoli served as artistic director for the opening and interval acts.

Visual design
The theme art and slogan for the contest, "The Sound of Beauty", was unveiled on 21 January 2022. Designed by Rome-based studio Flopicco, the artwork was built around the symmetrical structure and patterns of cymatics to convey the visual properties of sound, which also reflects Italian garden design, while the typography, Arsenica, was inspired by early-20th century Italian poster art; the colours were drawn from those of the Italian flag.

Presenters 

Television presenter Alessandro Cattelan and singers Laura Pausini and Mika were the presenters of the 2022 contest. They had already been named as likely hosts by Italian news agency Adnkronos and TV magazine TV Sorrisi e Canzoni; and were officially confirmed during the second night of the Sanremo Music Festival 2022 on 2 February, after appearing on that show as special guests.

Acampa, Carusino and Di Domenico also moderated the contest's press conferences.

Stage design 

The stage design for the 2022 contest was revealed on 18 February 2022. Designed by Rome-based stage designer  and dubbed "The Sun Within", the stage design was based around the movements and light of a kinetic sun, with the intended ability to showcase theatrical motion. The design also featured a working water cascade and a green room modelled after an Italian garden. Montinaro had previous experience in stage design, having done so for the Sanremo Music Festival in 2013 and 2019. This marked the first time since  that German stage designer  did not design the Eurovision stage.

Opening and interval acts 
On 30 April 2022, the EBU released information about the opening and interval acts.

The first semi-final was opened by a performance showcasing Italian ingenuity and creativity, accompanied by the official anthem of the contest, "The Sound of Beauty", performed by Sherol Dos Santos, while the interval featured a medley of "Horizon in Your Eyes", "Satisfaction" and "" performed by Dardust, Benny Benassi and Sophie and the Giants with conductor Sylvia Catasta, a brief homage to Raffaella Carrà performed by the contest presenters, and Diodato performing "".

The second semi-final was opened by "The Italian Way", an act built around Italian improvisation performed by co-presenter Alessandro Cattelan, while the interval featured a medley of "Fragile" and "People Have the Power" performed by co-presenters Laura Pausini and Mika, and Il Volo performing a new version of "".

The final was opened by the traditional flag parade, introducing all twenty-five finalists, accompanied by the Rockin' 1000 performing “Give Peace a Chance” and co-presenter Laura Pausini performing a medley of "", "", "", "" and "". The interval acts included Måneskin performing their new single "Supermodel" and "If I Can Dream", Gigliola Cinquetti performing her winning song "", and co-presenter Mika performing a medley of "Love Today", "Grace Kelly", his new single "Yo Yo" and "Happy Ending". Italian astronaut Samantha Cristoforetti also appeared in a pre-recorded message from the International Space Station.

Format

Entries 
For the second year in a row, delegations had the option to use pre-recorded backing vocals, though each delegation could still use backing singerswhether on or off stageor a combination of live and recorded backing vocals. However, all lead vocals performing the melody of the song must still be live. The EBU also required all national broadcasters to create a 'live-on-tape' backup recording prior to the contest which could be used if a participant was unable to travel to Turin, or subjected to quarantine on arrival. The 2022 contest also saw a tightening of the rules around song eligibility. Previously, the rules stated that the competing songs must not have been commercially released prior to 1 September of the previous year, now, a song may be ineligible to compete if it has been released to the public in any way, including live performances, before 1 September of the previous year. Enforcement of the rule was subject to the responsibility of the participating broadcasters.

With all participating artists having performed live in Turin, the majority of the 'live-on-tape' performances were released on the contest's official YouTube channel over a period of ten days, from 14 to 23 June 2022. Despite  not releasing their performance to the contest's official channel, it was nonetheless made available on the channel of the country's representative Vladana.

The 2022 contest was the first edition to not feature any competing song with lyrics in French.

Semi-final allocation draw 

The thirty-six semi-finalists were divided over six pots, based on historical voting patterns as calculated by the contest's official televoting partner Digame. The purpose of drawing from different pots was to reduce the chance of "bloc voting" and to increase suspense in the semi-finals. The ceremony was hosted by Carolina Di Domenico and Mario Acampa, with Acampa replacing Gabriele Corsi who tested positive for COVID-19. It included the passing of the host city insignia from Ahmed Aboutaleb, the mayor of previous host city Rotterdam, to Stefano Lo Russo, the mayor of Turin.

Postcards 
The "postcards" were 40-second video introductions shown on television whilst the stage is being prepared for the next contestant to perform their entry. Filmed between February and April, and directed by Matteo Lanzi, the 2022 postcards were based on the "Sound of Beauty" theme of the contest. Guided by a drone named "Leo", each postcard showcased a different locale in Italy adorned by pictures and various artistic elements related to the acts, while the participating artists themselves appeared via footage superimposed through chroma keying. The following locations were used for each participating country:

 Su Nuraxi, Barumini, Sardinia
 Marmore Falls, Terni, Umbria
 MART, Rovereto, Trentino-South Tyrol
 Miramare Castle, Trieste, Friuli Venezia Giulia
 Villa Monastero, Varenna, Lombardy
 Perugia, Umbria
 Castel del Monte, Andria, Apulia
 Grinzane Cavour, Cuneo, Piedmont
 Matterhorn, Aosta Valley
 Caserta, Campania
 Procida, Naples, Campania
 Sacra di San Michele, Sant'Ambrogio di Torino, Piedmont
 Laghi di Fusine, Udine, Friuli Venezia Giulia
 Cavour, Piedmont
 Burano, Venice, Veneto
 Lingotto, Turin, Piedmont
 Selinunte, Trapani, Sicily
 Cortina d'Ampezzo, Belluno, Veneto
 Matera, Basilicata
 Manarola, Cinque Terre, Liguria
 Mole Antonelliana, Turin, Piedmont
 Merano, Trentino-South Tyrol
 Bergamo, Lombardy
 Abbey of San Galgano, Siena, Tuscany
 Urbino, Marche
 Monte Conero, Ancona, Marche
 Ravenna, Emilia-Romagna
 , Nuoro, Sardinia
 Lago di Scanno, L'Aquila, Abruzzo
 Scala dei Turchi, Agrigento, Sicily
 Genoa, Liguria
 Isola di Capo Rizzuto, Crotone, Calabria
 Rome, Lazio
 Castle of Rocca Calascio, L'Aquila, Abruzzo
 Civita di Bagnoregio, Viterbo, Lazio
 Alagna Valsesia, Vercelli, Piedmont
 Rimini, Emilia-Romagna
 Termoli, Campobasso, Molise
 Florence, Tuscany
 Orta San Giulio, Novara, Piedmont

Participating countries 

The EBU initially announced on 20 October 2021 that 41 countries would participate in the 2022 contest. On 25 February 2022, the EBU announced that  was excluded from the contest due to the 2022 Russian invasion of Ukraine, thereby reducing the number of participating countries to 40.

Returning artists 
The contest featured five representatives who also previously performed as lead artists for the same country.

Semi-final 1
The first semi-final took place on 10 May 2022 at 21:00 (CEST). Seventeen countries participated in the first semi-final. Those countries plus  and  voted in this semi-final.  was originally allocated to participate in the second half of the first semi-final, but was excluded from the contest due to the 2022 Russian invasion of Ukraine. The highlighted countries qualified for the final.

Semi-final 2
The second semi-final took place on 12 May 2022 at 21:00 (CEST). Eighteen countries participated in the second semi-final. Those countries plus ,  and the  voted in this semi-final. The highlighted countries qualified for the final.

Final
The final took place on 14 May 2022 at 21:00 (CEST). Twenty-five countries participated in the final, with all forty participating countries eligible to vote.

Detailed voting results

Semi-final 1

12 points

Semi-final 2

12 points

Final

12 points 
Below is a summary of the maximum 12 points awarded by each country's professional jury and televote in the final. Countries in bold gave the maximum 24 points (12 points apiece from professional jury and televoting) to the specified entrant.

Spokespersons 
The spokespersons announced the 12-point score from their respective country's national jury in the following order:

 Jeangu Macrooy
  Labiuse 
 Jana Burčeska
 Aidan
 Kateryna Pavlenko
 Andri Xhahu
 Tanel Padar
 None
 Pedro Tatanka
 Barbara Schöneberger
 
 Tix
 
 Ida Nowakowska
 Stefania
 Elena Băncilă
 Janan Dural
 
 Árný Fjóla Ásmundsdóttir
 Loukas Hamatsos
 Samanta Tīna
 Nieves Álvarez
 Julie Berthollet
 Tina Müller
 Élodie Gossuin
 Garik Papoyan
 Andrijana Vešović
 None
 Linda Martin
 Lorella Flego
 None
 Ivan Dorian Molnar
 Vaidotas Valiukevičius
 Philipp Hansa
 Aksel
 AJ Odudu
 Dotter
 Courtney Act
 Taťána Kuchařová
 Carolina Di Domenico

Other countries 
Eligibility for potential participation in the Eurovision Song Contest requires a national broadcaster with active EBU membership that would be able to broadcast the contest via the Eurovision network. The EBU issued an invitation to participate in the contest to all active members. Associate member  did not need an invitation for the 2022 contest, as it had previously been granted permission to participate at least until 2023.

Active EBU members 

 On 1 August 2020, during an interview on Eurovision fansite Wiwibloggs' podcast, the  Andorran representative Susanne Georgi revealed that she had held a meeting with Prime Minister of Andorra Xavier Espot Zamora, during which they called for the country to make a return in 2022, having not returned for the previous year's contest due to the continuation of the COVID-19 pandemic in Andorra. However, on 19 June 2021, the Andorran broadcaster  (RTVA) stated that the principality would not return in 2022. Andorra last took part in 2009.
 In June 2021, Bosnian broadcaster Radio and Television of Bosnia and Herzegovina (BHRT) stated that it was unlikely that the country would return to the contest in the upcoming years, unless sufficient funding to do so is secured. On 12 October 2021, BHRT confirmed that Bosnia and Herzegovina would not return in 2022.
 In June 2021, it was confirmed by both the EBU and İbrahim Eren, the director general of Turkish national broadcaster Turkish Radio and Television Corporation (TRT), that they were in talks about the country potentially returning to the contest in 2022. However, Turkey did not appear on the final list of participants released by the EBU.

Non-EBU members 

 On 28 May 2021, the EBU Executive Board agreed to suspend the membership of Belarusian broadcaster BTRC as a result of its use by the Belarusian government as a propaganda tool. The broadcaster was given two weeks to respond before the suspension came into effect, but did not do so publicly. BTRC was expelled from the EBU on 1 July for a period of three years, therefore losing the rights to broadcast and participate in any Eurovision event until 1 July 2024; the broadcaster subsequently released a statement affirming that they would not be supporting Belarus' participation in upcoming years, including 2022.
 Liechtensteiner broadcaster 1 FL TV did not debut in the 2022 contest due to the high costs of participation. The broadcaster had attempted to become an EBU member in the past but halted its plans when its director, Peter Kölbel, unexpectedly died. It would also need the backing of the Liechtenstein government to be able to carry the cost of becoming an EBU member and paying the participation fee for the contest.
 Despite initially appearing on the list of participants, on 25 February 2022, following the 2022 Russian invasion of Ukraine and increasing protests from other participating countries, the EBU announced that Russia was excluded from the 2022 contest. The following day, all EBU members from Russia, including VGTRK and Channel One, announced their withdrawal from the union; however, the EBU itself had yet to receive a confirmation. On 1 March, a further statement from the EBU announced that it had suspended its Russian members from its governance structures. On 26 May, the EBU made effective the suspension of its Russian members, causing Russia to indefinitely lose broadcasting and participation rights for future Eurovision events.

Broadcasts 
All participating broadcasters may choose to have on-site or remote commentators providing an insight about the show and voting information to their local audience. While they must broadcast at least the semi-final they are voting in and the final, most broadcasters air all three shows with different programming plans. Similarly, some non-participating broadcasters may still want to air the contest.

The European Broadcasting Union provided international live streams of both semi-finals and the final through their official YouTube channel with no commentary, and through their official TikTok channel with an additional backstage feed. The YouTube live streams were geo-blocked to viewers in the Czech Republic, Greece, United Kingdom and the United States. After the live broadcasts, all three shows were made available for every country listed above except the United States.

For the first time in the contest's history, RAI trialled the broadcasts of the event in 4K UHD.

Viewing figures 
According to the EBU, in total 161 million people watched at least a minute of the television broadcasts, and 18 million people watched the online broadcasts.

Incidents

Impact of the Russian invasion of Ukraine

Ukrainian artist replacement 
Following the controversy surrounding the Ukrainian national selection in 2019, which led to the country withdrawing from the contest that year, a new rule was introduced starting from 2020 which bars artists who have performed in Russia since 2014 or have entered Crimea "in violation of the legislation of Ukraine" from entering the selection. The 2022 Ukrainian national selection was won by Alina Pash with the song "Shadows of Forgotten Ancestors". On 14 February 2022, two days after the selection, activist and video blogger Serhii Sternenko alleged that Pash had entered Crimea from Russian territory in 2015, and counterfeited her travel documentation with her team in order to take part in the selection. The Ukrainian broadcaster UA:PBC subsequently stated that they would request the Ukrainian State Border Guard Service to verify if the documentation is forged, and that Pash would not officially be the Ukrainian representative at the contest "until the verification and clarification of the facts is completed". After it was discovered that a representative of Pash's team had handed in falsified documentation to UA:PBC, on 16 February, Pash announced that she would withdraw her candidacy as the Ukrainian representative at the contest. Runner-up of the selection, Kalush Orchestra with the song "Stefania", were given an offer to represent Ukraine in Pash's place on 17 February. On 22 February, UA:PBC confirmed that Kalush Orchestra had accepted the offer.

Exclusion of Russia 
In the wake of the 2022 Russian invasion of Ukraine, which began on 24 February, UA:PBC appealed to suspend Russian EBU member broadcasters VGTRK and Channel One from the union, and to exclude Russia from competing in the contest. The appeal alleged that since the beginning of the Russian military intervention in Ukraine in 2014, VGTRK and Channel One have been a mouthpiece for the Russian government and a key tool of political propaganda financed from the Russian state budget. The EBU initially stated that Russia as well as Ukraine would still be allowed to participate in the contest, citing the non-political nature of the event.

Several broadcasters expressed their concern at the decision and issued statements calling for the removal of Russia from the contest. In addition to Ukraine's UA:PBC, nine other countries' broadcasters requested the EBU to change the decision: Denmark's DR, Estonia's ERR, Finland's Yle, Iceland's RÚV, Lithuania's LRT, the Netherlands' AVROTROS, Norway's NRK, Poland's TVP and Sweden's SVT. Yle also stated that they would withdraw their participation if Russia were not excluded from the contest. This was followed by a similar announcement from ERR. Latvian representatives Citi Zēni also urged the EBU to reconsider Russian participation. On 25 February 2022, the EBU announced that Russia would not compete at the contest, stating that "in light of the unprecedented crisis in Ukraine, the inclusion of a Russian entry in this year's Contest would bring the competition into disrepute." The following day, all EBU members from Russia, including VGTRK and Channel One, announced their withdrawal from the union, according to a statement released by Russian state media. Russia had not publicly announced an artist or song before being excluded.

Ukrainian preparations 
Following the start of the Russian invasion of Ukraine, UA:PBC and Kalush Orchestra had yet to formally comment on whether their participation in the contest would continue. On 14 March 2022, Claudio Fasulo and Simona Martorelli, executive producers of the 2022 contest, confirmed that Ukraine would still be competing; this was later reaffirmed by UA:PBC on 19 March via a post on its social media pages. They added that work would commence on the Ukrainian 'live-on-tape' backup performance, which was planned to be recorded in Lviv and used in the event that the delegation cannot travel to Turin, however, the delegation was later exempted from the requirement to do so. On 2 April, UA:PBC confirmed that Kalush Orchestra and the rest of the delegation was given permission to travel to Turin for the contest, adding that the group would also take part in promotional events across Europe to raise donations for war relief efforts.

Attempted cyber attacks 
On 11 May 2022, pro-Russia hacker group Killnet carried out an attack on numerous Italian institutional websites, including those of the Ministry of Defense, the Senate, the National Health Institute and the Automobile Club d'Italia. The official website of the Eurovision Song Contest was later revealed to be among those that were targeted, in addition to the platform on which the contest's voting system is based. Additional attacks were reported to have taken place during the first semi-final and the final. The attacks were ultimately unsuccessful, and there were no disruptions to either the website or the voting platform.

On-stage statements 
During the broadcast of the final, after Kalush Orchestra had finished their performance, the group's frontman Oleh Psiuk shouted onstage: "I ask all of you, please help Ukraine, Mariupol. Help Azovstal, right now!" The contest's rules precludes promoting political statements and messages, and several commentators noted that Psiuk's statement could be in breach of the rules. However, the EBU deemed the statement to be "humanitarian rather than political in nature”. The German and Icelandic representatives, Malik Harris and Systur respectively, also showed support for Ukraine onstage after finishing their performances.

Rehearsal stage malfunction 

During the first day of rehearsals in Turin on 30 April 2022, Italian newspapers  and  reported technical difficulties with the 'kinetic sun' component of the stage, with its arches not being able to move as freely as expected. The papers also reported that the malfunction could not be completely fixed in time for the live shows. Several delegations, among them those from Belgium, Denmark, Estonia, Finland and Lithuania, were forced to revise their staging plans, having been informed of the malfunction a few days prior.  later reported the following day that a compromise was reached, in which the arches would stay static for the competing entries' performances, while for the opening and interval acts, the arches would be permitted to move dynamically. This was later confirmed by the EBU in a statement issued to Danish broadcaster DR on 2 May.

Macedonian flag incident  
During the "Turquoise Carpet" event on 8 May 2022, the Macedonian representative Andrea was seen lightly tossing the Macedonian flag on the ground before posing for the press. The Macedonian broadcaster MRT later published a statement condemning her action, describing it as "desecration of a national symbol, which is punishable by Macedonian law". In the same statement, the broadcaster stated that it was considering withdrawing Andrea from the contest, and that people in the delegation that are deemed responsible for the incident would be sanctioned. Andrea herself issued an apology later that day. MRT eventually confirmed its non-participation in the 2023 contest, citing financial difficulties, instead.

Jury vote irregularities 
As a result, these six countries were given substitute aggregated jury results for the second semi-final and the final based on countries with similar voting patterns, as determined by the pots that the countries were put into for the semi-final allocation draw in January. The Flemish broadcaster VRT later reported that the juries of the countries involved had made agreements to vote for each other.

During the announcement of the jury votes in the final, Azerbaijan, Romania and Georgia had their votes announced by Martin Österdahl, the contest's executive supervisor. This was stated to have been due to technical difficulties in establishing connection with those countries' designated spokespersons. The spokespersons who would have announced them were Narmin Salmanova, Eda Marcus and Helen Kalandadze respectively. A press release from the Romanian broadcaster TVR on 20 May revealed that the reason for Österdahl's intervention on behalf of the Romanian spokesperson was due to TVR's refusal to accept the aggregate scores calculated by the EBU.

The day after the final, TVR accused the EBU of "changing the rules" and requested further clarification of the incident. In their original decision, the Romanian jury awarded 12 points to Moldova. The Georgian broadcaster GPB and the Azerbaijani broadcaster İTV also requested a more detailed statement on the jury vote issues, disclosing that their juries' 12 points were originally awarded to Ukraine. The Montenegrin broadcaster RTCG and the Polish broadcaster TVP also requested more clarification on the issue. In addition, TVR and İTV claimed that no technical difficulties had occurred during the jury voting segment of the final.

On 19 May 2022, the EBU released the full breakdown of the nullified jury votes from the second semi-final. RTCG, TVR and the Sammarinese broadcaster SMRTV denied any wrongdoing on their part, with the former two claiming that other irregular voting patterns existed but were not detected. TVR also threatened to withdraw from the contest for 2023 and future editions, while also planning to take legal action against the EBU in response. However, it was reported by Romanian news outlet Impact.ro on 29 July that TVR had dropped all of its objections, and on 26 August, TVR confirmed its participation in the 2023 contest.

Other awards 
In addition to the main winner's trophy, the Marcel Bezençon Awards and the You're A Vision Award were contested during the Eurovision Song Contest 2022. The OGAE, "General Organisation of Eurovision Fans" voting poll also took place before the contest.

Marcel Bezençon Awards 
The Marcel Bezençon Awards, organised since 2002 by Sweden's then-Head of Delegation and 1992 representative Christer Björkman, and winner of the 1984 contest Richard Herrey, honours songs in the contest's final. The awards are divided into three categories: the Artistic Award, the Composers Award, and the Press Award. The winners were revealed shortly before the Eurovision final on 14 May.

OGAE 
OGAE, an organisation of over forty Eurovision Song Contest fan clubs across Europe and beyond, conducts an annual voting poll first held in 2002 as the Marcel Bezençon Fan Award. After all votes were cast, the top-ranked entry in the 2022 poll was Sweden's "Hold Me Closer" performed by Cornelia Jakobs; the top five results are shown below.

You're A Vision Award 
2022 saw the first edition of the You're A Vision Award (a word play of "Eurovision"), ran by the fansite Songfestival.be. Following the cancellation of the Barbara Dex Award due to its associated negative connotations, the You're A Vision Award was established with the aim to "celebrate the creativity and diversity that embody the Eurovision spirit", with the winner being the one with the most notable outfit. Australia's Sheldon Riley won the award, with Spain's Chanel, Norway's Subwoolfer, and San Marino's Achille Lauro completing the top four.

Eurovision Awards 
The second edition of the Eurovision Awards saw the competing acts of 2022 celebrated across ten categories. Shortlists were determined by major Eurovision fansites and podcasts, with editors and presenters nominating their favourites in each category; the final result was determined by followers of the official Eurovision Instagram channel who cast votes for their favourite act.

Winners are listed first and highlighted in boldface.

Official album 

Eurovision Song Contest: Turin 2022 is the official compilation album of the contest, put together by the European Broadcasting Union and was released by Universal Music Group digitally on 8 April 2022, in CD format on 22 April 2022, and in cassette and vinyl formats on 6 May 2022. The album features all 40 entries including the semi-finalists that failed to qualify for the final.

Charts

Weekly charts

Year-end charts

See also 
 American Song Contest
 Eurovision Young Musicians 2022
 Junior Eurovision Song Contest 2022

Notes

References

External links 
 

Album chart usages for IrelandComp
 
2022
2022 in Italy
2022 in Italian television
Music festivals in Italy
Music competitions in Italy
May 2022 events in Italy
2022 song contests
Events in Turin
Music in Turin
Events affected by the 2022 Russian invasion of Ukraine